Mark Hembrow (born 1955, in Brisbane) is an Australian actor, writer and musician. He has also has worked as a producer and director.

Early life and family
Hembrow's parents were Vernon Charles Hembrow, a senior English Literature Lecturer at the Teachers Training College at Kelvin Grove and Sally Hembrow, a daytime television personality and presenter and cooking specialist. Sally produced her own television show for QTQ9 on the Nine Network, 'Living Graciously', which aired from 1963-1973. She was a forerunner for women in television, food, fashion and interior decor in Australia. Sally also had a radio show on 4KQ named 'Hotline to the Oven'.

Hembrow's education was at Ashgrove State School and then St. Peters Lutheran College Indooroopilly. He has one brother, John.

Personal life
Hembrow was married to Nathalie Stanley, whom he met while in Trinidad and Tobago filming The Last Island (1990). They have three daughters together, Amy (born June 1990), Emilee (born January 1992) and Tammy (born April 1994), who are well-known social media personalities and entrepreneurs. It is unknown when Hembrow and Stanley divorced.

Career
Mark first stepped on stage at age 16 at La Boîte Theatre Company as Barnaby Tucker in The Matchmaker and then Sandy in Hayfever and Apollo in Fetch Me A Fig Leaf the musical, all directed by Graham Johnson. He then performed the lead in Once Upon a Mattress at the Arts Theatre , which was to be his last amateur production at aged 17.

At 18 years of age, Mark first started working professionally for the main company at Queensland Theatre Company where he worked in productions over two years while doing in-service training. Productions included 'Springle' a secondary school theatre and education production, written by Billy Brown to celebrate 100 years of education. He also performed in Equus, School for Scoundrels, Savages, Jumpers, The Department, Hamlet and Fourth of July before heading to Sydney.

His first professional jobs in Sydney were with the Old Tote Theatre Company (now Sydney Theatre Company) in a production of Night of the Iguana and on Television series Young Doctors as Georgie Saint. He then worked on two musicals, Rocky Horror Show and Paradise Regained. And then in his first feature, Goodbye Paradise directed by Karl Schultz.

Mark proceeded to do many television shows and feature films over the years . Mark  returned  home from the USA to raise a family decided to have a break for a number of years away from the Public Eye and film and television to raise his three daughters in the Mountains. During this time he wrote two feature film scripts and was composing music.

Mark's return to the screen has been celebrated. He is also passionate and involved in relief water projects and salvaging projects globally for results to help others .

Recent guest roles on Australian television include The Straits directed by Rachael Ward and Old School starring Bryan Brown and Sam Neil by Matchbox Productions.

Credits

Film
The Crypto Kids (TBA) as Charles Balak
Chiroptera (2019) as Boris
Swimming Upstream (2003) as Tommy
Heaven's Burning (1997) as Truck Driver
On the Dead Side (1995)
Exchange Lifeguards (aka Wet & Wild Summer!) (1993) as Max
Redheads (1992 film) (1992) as Brewster 
The Last Island (1990) as Frank
Out of the Body (1988) as David Gaze
Fragments of War: The Story of Damien Parer (1988) as Padre
Sons of Steel (1988) as Mal
The Man from Snowy River 2: Return to Snowy River (1988) as Seb
Running from the Guns (1987) as Peter
High Tide (1987 film) (1987) as Mechanic
Last Chance (1986) as Angus
Robbery (1985 film) (aka The Great Bookie Robbery) (1986)
Who Killed Hannah Jane? (1984)
Platypus Cove (1983) as Paddy O’Neill
At Last... Bullamakanka: The Motion Picture (1983) as L.D. James
Goodbye Paradise (1982) as Igor
The Highest Honour (1982) as Able Seaman F.W. Marsh
Rusty Bugles (1981)
Shimmering Light (1978) as Peter

Short films
Run (TBA) as Valet
4-Eva (1993)
Dial-A-Cliché (1992)
Brothers (2015) as Todd
Desire (1981)

Television
Old School (TV series) (mini-series) (2014) as Perry Robertson
The Straits (mini-series) (2012) as Ambrose
The Lost World (2001 film) (2001) as Hyde
Tales of the South Seas (mini-series) (2000)
Misery Guts (1998) as Arnold Flashman 
G.P. (1995) as Mr David Barber
Time Trax (1993) as Rufio Jans
Phoenix (Australian TV series) (1993) as Damian Thorpe
The Adventures of Skippy (1992) as Paul Watson
Animal Park (1991 TV series) (1991) as Jim Pryor
The Flying Doctors (1988 & 1990) as Tony Downes & Bob Archer
Anzacs (mini-series) (1985) as Private Dick Baker
1915 (mini-series) (1982) as Boof Lucas
Jonah (1982 miniseries) (mini-series) (1982) as Waxy
Spring & Fall (1980-82) as Mickey
Home Sweet Home (Australian TV series) (1980) as Brian
Celebrity Tattle Tales (1989) as self
Hollywood (TV Follies) (1979)
Father, Dear Father (aka Father, Dear Father in Australia) (1978) as Ken
The Young Doctors (1977) as Georgie Saint
Patrol Boat
Mr Squiggle as Guest Singer

Writing
One Summer (in development)
In Danger of Winning (in development)
The Argues: The Movie (aka Duck Struck) (2010)
Anzacs (mini-series) (1985)
Out of the Body (1988)
The Man from Snowy River 2: Return to Snowy River (1988)
Running from the Guns (1987)
At Last... Bullamakanka: The Motion Picture (1983)
Shimmering Light (1978)

Producer
Razz, Gable & Skid 
The Argues: The Movie (aka Duck Struck) (2010)

Executive Producer
Didge on Fire

Discography

Singles

References

External links

Male actors from Brisbane
1955 births
Living people